Sirithal Rasipen is a 2009 Tamil language comedy film directed, written and produced by V. Chandrasekaran. The film stars Sathya and Sunu Lakshmi, alongside an ensemble cast of M. S. Bhaskar, Lakshmy Ramakrishnan, Manobala, Kalpana, Mayilsamy, Lollu Sabha Balaji, Sathyan, Ansiba Hassan, Thyagu, and Shanmugarajan, amongst others, in supporting roles. The film had musical score by Iniyavan and was released on 3 July 2009.

Plot
Boopathy Pandian (M. S. Bhaskar) is a strict father who uses the whip abundantly on anyone who disobeys him. His wife Lakshmy (Lakshmy Ramakrishnan) is bedridden, he has two good-for-nothing sons Rama (Mayilsamy) and Krishna (Lollu Sabha Balaji), two daughters-in-law, and two daughters. He is against love marriages since his own sister Eshwari (Kalpana) ran away with the sorcerer Vikramadithyan (Thyagu), who is now his archenemy. His younger daughter Divya (Sunu Lakshmi) is in love with Siddhu (Sathya), the son of the family manager (Manobala). The night, the lovers secretly meet without the authoritarian Boopathy Pandian knowing. Boopathy Pandian then suspects Vikramadithyan's son Purushothaman (Sathyan) of stalking his daughter. When Boopathy Pandian warns Vikramadithyan to whip again him as he did when Vikramadithyan married his sister, Vikramadithyan swears that his son will marry his younger daughter Divya at any cost.

One day, Boopathy Pandian finds out an unsigned love letter to Divya. Boopathy Pandian whips his daughter and suspects Purushothaman for writing it, but Purushothaman claims that he has never gone to school and that he is illiterate. Boopathy Pandian decides to hire rowdies to protect his daughter. Therefore, the four clumsy rowdies - Maaja (Mahanadi Shankar), Goda Govindan (Crane Manohar), Karadi (Bonda Mani), and Bruce Lee (Velmurugan) - come to his house. Boopathy Pandian then learns that Siddhu is Divya's lover and feels betrayed by Siddhu, for whom he had high regard. Thereafter, Boopathy Pandian meets his old friend Thangaraj (Shanmugarajan), and Boopathy Pandian accepts for Divya to get married with Thangaraj's NRI son Rajendran (Kovai Babu). Later, Rajendran comes back home with his newlywed wife. The greedy Thangaraj, who wants all of Boopathy Pandian's wealth, drives his newly-wed daughter-in-law away, and Rajendran accepts for the marriage. In the meantime, Boopathy Pandian's daughter Viji (Ansiba Hassan) elopes with the rowdy Maaja, and they secretly get married.

The day of the wedding - with Purushothama his parents on one side and Siddhu with the four rowdies on the other - decide to stop the wedding between Divya and the greedy Rajendran. Divya pleaded with her sisters and mother to let her marry Siddhu. They accept and help her elope with Siddhu. Later, Lakshmy convinces Purushothaman to forget Divya. Therefore, Purushothaman decides to help Divya and Siddhu, but Boopathy Pandian, Thangaraj, and Rajendran are hell bent on stopping this elopement. Boopathy Pandian then realises that Thangaraj and Rajendran tried to cheat him and cancels the wedding.

Many months later, Divya is happily married to Siddhu and is pregnant. Boopathy Pandian becomes a nice person and makes peace with Vikramadithyan.

Cast

Sathya as Siddhu
Sunu Lakshmi as Divya
M. S. Bhaskar as Boopathy Pandian
Lakshmy Ramakrishnan as Lakshmy
Manobala as Siddhu's father
Kalpana as Eshwari
Mayilsamy as Rama
Lollu Sabha Balaji as Krishna
Sathyan as Purushothaman
Ansiba Hassan as Viji
Thyagu as Vikramadithyan
Shanmugarajan as Thangaraj
Kovai Babu as Rajendran
Mahanadi Shankar as Maaja
Crane Manohar as Goda Govindan
Bonda Mani as Karadi
Velmurugan as Bruce Lee
Singamuthu as Tea Master
King Kong as Kaththi Kuththu Pandian
Lekhasri as Kamala
Ramya as Kavitha
Chelladurai
Yogi Babu as Henchman (uncredited role)

Production
The film director and producer V. Chandrasekaran signed Sathya and newcomer Sunu Lakshmi to play the lead roles in the film. Twelve comedians : M. S. Bhaskar, Thyagu, Manobala, Sathyan, Mahanadi Shankar, Mayilsamy, Lollu Sabha Balaji, Crane Manohar, Velmurugan, Bonda Mani, Singamuthu and King Kong were selected to act in this film. Apart from this, Shanmugarajan will act in an important role. Sirithal Rasipen has been shot extensively in Chalakudy, Courtallam and Guruvayur.

Soundtrack

The film score and the soundtrack were composed by Iniyavan. The soundtrack, released in 2009, features 6 tracks with lyrics written by P. Vijay, Snehan, Yugabharathi and Annamalai.

Reception

Sify said, "fast paced action and never a dull moment make Sirithal Rasipen an interesting watch".

References

2009 films
2000s Tamil-language films
2009 romantic comedy films
Indian romantic comedy films
Films shot in Tamil Nadu
Films shot in Kerala
Films shot in Thrissur
Films shot in Chalakudy